Uvdal Stave Church (Uvdal stavkirke) is situated at Uvdal in the valley Numedal in Nore og Uvdal in Buskerud, Norway. The stave church was originally constructed just after the year 1168, which is known through dendrochronological dating of the ore-pine used in the construction. The logs were not completely dry when the construction took place.

Construction history 
An archeological excavation that took place during 1978 showed that the church was built on the remains of a previous church. It is thought to have been made with the use of embedded corner column technology at the beginning of the 11th century.

Churches made during the 12th century were usually very small, often no more than 40 square meters, and were therefore often expanded, even during the Middle Ages and certainly just before and after the Reformation, which took place during 1537 in Norway.

The nave of the church was first expanded to the west during the Middle Ages, when the original apse of the chancel was also removed and the chancel itself elongated. Again, during that period, an extra center column was added. The chancel was torn down again in 1684, when a new and wider chancel was made, with the same width as the nave. Then, during the period 1721–1723, the church was made into a cruciform. A new ridge turret had to be made, to fit the new shape. Later, in 1819, a new vestry was added to the north wall of the chancel.

Exterior 
The exterior walls were paneled in 1760.

Interior
Benches with ornately decorated sidewalls were added to the nave in 1624. The oldest part of the interior was probably richly ornately decorated by painting during 1656, the expansions during 1684 and 1723. Two scary halfmasks are quite visible on the poles of the chancel, and according to myth they were able to capture demons.

Miscellaneous 
The church survives today as museum piece, owned by Fortidsminneforeningen, which also happens to own several other stave churches that survive. The church was taken out of use in 1893, but services still take place during the summer season. As of June 2016, photographing of the highly decorated interior (even with flash) was allowed.  In the late nineties the local internet site Numedalsnett was allowed to shoot a short interior video with minimum equipment and lightning. The video clip is available on YouTube.

Gallery

References

Further reading
 Leif Anker (2005) The Norwegian Stave Churches (Oslo: Arfo Forlag)

External links

 Uvdal Stave Church (Riksantikvaren)
 Uvdal Stave Church (Fortidsminneforeningen) (in Norwegian)
 Uvdal Stave Church – interior shots (video) on Youtube
 Uvdal Stave Church in a video about stave churches in Numedal

12th-century churches in Norway
Stave churches in Norway
Nore og Uvdal
Buildings and structures owned by the Society for the Preservation of Ancient Norwegian Monuments
Churches completed in 1168